Vitry-sur-Seine is a commune in the southeastern suburbs of Paris, France,  from the centre of Paris.

Name
Vitry-sur-Seine was originally called simply Vitry. The name Vitry comes from Medieval Latin Vitriacum, and before that Victoriacum, meaning "estate of Victorius", a Gallo-Roman landowner. In 1897 the name of the commune officially became Vitry-sur-Seine (meaning "Vitry upon Seine"), in order to distinguish it from other communes of France also called Vitry.

Main sights
 Musée d'Art Contemporain du Val-de-Marne

Culture
For some years, Vitry-sur-Seine operated a cultural policy of bringing art to all. For this reason, the commune contains over 100 contemporary sculptures, notably in establishments of public education (schools, secondary schools and High Schools).

Vitry hosts the Musée d'Art Contemporain du Val-de-Marne (Val-de-Marne's Museum of Contemporary Art). Opened on 18 November 2005, this museum offers in addition to the workshops of plastic arts, an auditorium and a cinema for art and experimental film.

Vitry is one of the cities that contributed to the development of the Hip hop movement in France. Consequentially, urban art has a very important place in the city

Transport
Vitry-sur-Seine is served by two stations on Paris RER line C: Vitry-sur-Seine and Les Ardoines.

Orly Airport is located near Vitry-sur-Seine.

Demographics

The city can be separated into three distinct parts: the center containing numerous cités HLM (Housing projects), peripheral neighborhoods belonging to the middle class, and a large industrial area along the Seine river.

The bordering towns are Ivry-sur-Seine, Villejuif, Chevilly-Larue, Thiais, Choisy-le-Roi, Alfortville.

In 2017 the population of the city was estimated at 93,500 inhabitants. Vitry-sur-Seine is the 46th most populated city of France and the seventh of Île-de-France. The rate of unemployment is 26.5%, while national average is under 10%.

Immigration

As of circa 1998 Ivry-sur-Seine and Vitry had a combined Asian population of 3,600. That year about 250 Asians from those communes worked in the 13th arrondissement of Paris, and the overall demographics of Ivry and Vitry Asians were similar to those in the 13th arrondissement.

Administration
Vitry is divided into two cantons (districts):
Vitry-sur-Seine-1 counts 46,849 inhabitants (as of 2014)
Vitry-sur-Seine-2 counts 44,339 inhabitants (as of 2014)

Cités (Housing projects)
Cité Balzac
Cité Du Colonel Fabien
Lucien Français
Les Marronniers
La Sablière 200
La Commune de Paris
Mario Capra
Les Montagnards
Les Montagnes (La Vanoise, Pelvoux, Annapurna)
La Tourraine
Le Mail
Le Moulin Vert
Les Toits et Joie
Gabriel Peri
Cité Robespierre

Cité Barbusse
Le Square de l'Horloge
Cité Camille Groult
Les Malassis
Rouget de l'isle
La Glacière
Cité Bourgogne
Cité Verte
Cité Bleu (Camille Blanc)
Cité des Combattants
Roger Derry
Rosenberg
Cité des Peupliers-Manouchians
La Semise
Couzy

Education
 the commune has 23 preschools (maternelles), and 21 elementary schools, with a combined total of 9,000 students.
 Public junior high schools (collèges): Danielle-Casanova, Adolphe-Chérioux, Lakanal, Gustave-Monod, and Collège Jules-Valles
 In addition Collège Romain-Rolland in Ivry-sur-Seine serves a portion of Vitry-sur-Seine
 Senior high schools: Lycée Adolphe-Chérioux, Lycée Camille-Claudel, and Lycée Jean-Macé
 Lycée Romain-Rolland is in adjacent Ivry-sur-Seine
 Private junior-senior high school: Collège-lycée privé Epin

Paris 12 Val de Marne University is the area university.

Twin towns – sister cities

Vitry-sur-Seine is twinned with:
 Burnley, England, United Kingdom (1958)
 Kladno, Czech Republic (1966)
 Meissen, Germany (1973)

Notable people
Jimmy Briand, footballer
Cédric Bakambu, footballer
Cerrone, musician
Doudou Masta, rapper
Damien Dovy, karateka
David Fleurival, footballer
Mickaël Hanany, athlete
Jimmy Kébé, footballer
 113, rap group
Ritchie Makuma Mpasa, footballer
Richard Massolin, footballer
Jérémy Menez, footballer
Maguy Nestoret, athlete
Rohff, rapper
Arsène Tchakarian, French-Armenian historian and resistance fighter
Lassana Touré, basketball player

See also

Communes of the Val-de-Marne department
Ary Bitter

References

External links
 Official website
 Val-de-Marne's Museum of Contemporary Art
Paris-Sud Community 

Communes of Val-de-Marne
Cities in Île-de-France